1,000 years may refer to:

 a millennium, a period of 1,000 years
 1,000 Years, an album by the Corin Tucker Band
 1000 Years, an extended play by Savoy
 1,000 Years and 1 Day, an album by Robyn Miller
 "A Thousand Years" (Christina Perri song)

See also
A Thousand Years (disambiguation)
Millennium (disambiguation)